The 1970–71 Scottish Cup was the 86th staging of Scotland's most prestigious football knockout competition. The Cup was won by Celtic who defeated Rangers in the replayed final.

First round

Second round

Third round

Replays

Second Replays

Fourth round

Replays

Quarter-finals

Semi-finals

Replays

Final

Teams

Replay

Teams

See also
1970–71 in Scottish football
1970–71 Scottish League Cup

References

Scottish Cup seasons
1970–71 in Scottish football
Scot